Socorro is a municipality in the state of São Paulo in Brazil. The city is located on the "do Peixe" River and in Mantiqueira Mountains, bordering the state of Minas Gerais to the north and east. Currently, the city's economy is based in the sector of clothing (knitting), ecotourism and adventure sports.

History

Foundation 
Socorro was settled in 1738 by Simão Toledo Pizza, after the local indigenous people (Carajás) left the place due to the Bandeirantes incursions. At that time, it was known as Campanha de Toledo (Toledo's Campaign), it belonged to the then-called Sertão de Bragança (Bragança's Countryside) and it had a population of 922. In 1839, a chapel in honor of  Our Lady of Perpetual Help was built in the place where today is located the Main Church of the city. The first mass was conducted on August 9, the birthday of the municipality. However, it wasn't until 1883 that it had really become a municipality. In 1889, it became a comarca. In 1945, Fernando Costa, then governor of São Paulo, elevated it to the condition of "Estância Sanitária".

Coffee and Italian immigration 
Since the 19th century, the city is an important coffee producer. When the slavery was brought down and the so-called Old Republic begun, Italian immigrants arrived in São Paulo to replace the now-free slaves in the coffee farms. The farmers from São Paulo wanted a railway to more efficiently take their coffee to the ports. As the construction of railways connecting the coast to the countryside started, the Companhia Mogyana de Estradas de Ferro was created, having its first train station inaugurated on March 18, 1872, in Campinas.

On April 21, 1909, the Socorro section was built, and the city began to develop faster. In 1929, with the 1929 Great Crash and the subsequent depression, many coffee farmers saw their productions decreasing, which led most to bankruptcy. As such, many Italians had the opportunity of buying land for a cheap price.

In 1945, the city was visited by the "Pracinhas" - members of the Brazilian Expeditionary Force, which battled in Italy during the Second World War.

In 1978, Socorro was given the status of "Estância Turística" and regained its political rights, allowing its population to elect its mayors.

Investments in Tourism 
In 2004, restaurants, hotels, theaters and other services were given four years to fully adapt their buildings for disabled people. It was part of the project Socorro Acessível. Since 2005, Socorro takes part of Adventure Sport Fair and, in 2005, the Ministry of tourism of Brazil spoke about accessibility in this fair. The  adventure sports was the most difficult part, since the creation of appropriate equipments would be also required, apart from ramps, wheelchairs and altered toilets. As the ministry, local NGOs and companies and the city hall joined forces, the studies required for such adaptations were conducted.

Geography
The city is mountainous and crossed by many rivers, the main ones being Do Peixe, Camanducaia and das Antas.

Climate
According to the Köppen climate classification Socorro has a humid subtropical climate.

Economy 
The city's economy relies mainly on services such as tourism, commerce, etc. (45%), industry (35%) and agriculture (20%)

Tourism 
The city attracts tourists specially because of its extreme sports facilities and parks located on its outskirts. There, it is possible to practice:

 Haka Race, a competition involving sports such as Rafting, long-duration hiking, cycle-tourism, zipline and others;
 Acqua-ride and Boia Cross; to ride a rapid in inflatable buoy;
 Canoeing;
 Rafting;
 Rappelling;
 Zipline;
 Climbing;
 Quadcycling;
 Free flight and paragliding.

References

External links

  Prefeitura de Socorro The official website of Socorro.
  Câmara Municipal de Socorro Socorro City Council website.
  Estância de Socorro A tourism website about Socorro.

Municipalities in São Paulo (state)
Spa towns in Brazil
Populated places established in 1829